Vengalam was former constituency in the Tamil Nadu Legislative Assembly of Tamil Nadu a southern state of India. It was in Perambalur district.

Madras state

Election results

1962

References

External links
 

Perambalur district
Former assembly constituencies of Tamil Nadu